Eduardo Fernández or Eduardo Fernandez is the name of:

 Eduardo Fernández (guitarist)
 Eduardo Fernández (Venezuelan politician) (born 1940), Venezuelan politician and lawyer
 Eduardo Fernández (Argentine politician) (born 1952), Argentine politician
 Eduardo Fernández (Peruvian footballer) (1923–2002), Peruvian football forward
 Eduardo Fernández (Mexican footballer) (born 1990), Mexican football midfielder
 Eduardo Fernández Rubiño (born 1991), Spanish politician

See also
 Lalo Fernández (born 1992), born Eduardo Fernández Lopez, Mexican football goalkeeper